R Crucis is a variable star in the southern constellation of Crux. It has a yellow-white hue and is often too faint to see with the naked eye, having an apparent visual magnitude that fluctuates around 6.89. This object is located at a distance of approximately 1,600 light years from the Sun based on parallax, but it is drifting closer with a radial velocity of −13.5 km/s.

This is a Classical Cepheid, or Delta Cephei variable, that ranges in brightness from visual magnitude 6.40 down to 7.23 with a period of 5.82575 days. It is a supergiant star with a stellar classification that varies over each pulsation cycle, giving it a class range of F6-G2Ib-II. The star has a mean radius 44.6 times the radius of the Sun, but the radius varies by  during each pulsation. It has a near solar metallicity and the atmospheric abundances indicate it is likely past first dredge-up.

The system is a source for X-ray emission but the contributing component is unclear.

References 

F-type bright giants
Classical Cepheid variables

Crux (constellation)
Durchmusterung objects
107805
060455
Crucis, R